The Consulate General of Romania in Vršac is a consulate general of Romania to Serbia opened in 2005. Alexandru Mureșan serves as the general consul.

References

External links 
 General Consulate of Romania - Vrsac
 Ziua Nationala la romanii din Varset: spectacol extraordinar al ansamblului „Doina Gorjului”
 1ROMANII%20DIN%20BANATUL%20SARBESC.doc "Românii din Banatul Sârbesc"
 Comunitatea Românilor din Serbia
 Zeci de mii de vize, eliberate sârbilor şi albanezilor, de Consulatul Românie de la Vârșeț contra unei taxe plătite fostului preşedinte al CRS, Ion Cismaş

Vrsac
Vršac
2005 establishments in Serbia
Diplomatic missions in Vršac
Romania–Serbia relations